The Polish Patent Office (PPO) is the patent office of Poland. It is based in Warsaw.

See also 
 Visegrad Patent Institute

External links 
 Polish Patent Office
 Polish Patent Office on Wikimedia Commons

Polish intellectual property law
Patent offices